Characodoma elegans is a species of bryozoans. It is found in the South China Sea.

References 

 Characodoma elegans at WoRMS

Cheilostomatida
Animals described in 1991
Fauna of China
South China Sea